Dmitriyevskaya Sloboda is a rural locality (a selo) in Muromsky District, Vladimir Oblast, Russia. The population was 1,381 as of 2010. There are 11 streets.

Geography 
Dmitriyevskaya Sloboda is located 4 km north of Murom. Fabriki im. P. L. Voykova is the nearest rural locality.

References 

Rural localities in Muromsky District
Muromsky Uyezd